The LACAB GR.8 Doryphore was a prototype Belgian multi-role combat aircraft of the 1930s. A twin-engined biplane, it was intended to carry out bombing and reconnaissance missions, as well as act as an escort fighter. It was already obsolete when completed and no more were built.

Development and design
In 1934, the Belgian Air Force drew up a specification for a multi-purpose bomber and long-range reconnaissance aircraft, which could also act as a heavy fighter. To meet this requirement, designs were produced by Les Ateliers de Constructions Aéronautiques Belges (LACAB) and by Stampe et Vertongen (the Stampe SV-10).

The LACAB design was a twin-engined biplane of mixed construction, with a slab-sided steel tube fuselage with plywood and fabric covering and wooden, two-bay unequal span wings. It was powered by two Gnome-Rhône Mistral Major radial engines mounted between the wings, and was fitted with a fixed tailwheel undercarriage.

Manually operated gun turrets, each mounting two machine guns, were mounted in nose and dorsal positions, while two more guns were in a ventral position.

The sole prototype first flew on 14 May 1936 and was handed over to the Belgian Air Force for testing on 2 July 1936. The Spanish Republican Air Force attempted to buy the prototype LACAB GR.8, but the international arms embargo prevented delivery to Spain.

The prototype was badly damaged in a landing accident on 4 April 1938 with its undercarriage and starboard wings destroyed. Although the aircraft was repaired, it was not flown again, and no production was undertaken. The GR.8 was scrapped after the German invasion of Belgium in May 1940.

Operators

Belgian Air Force

Specifications

References

"Plane Facts:The unaesthetic LACAB". Air International, January 1977, Volume 12 No. 1. Bromley,UK:Fine Scroll Publishing. p. 46.
 Grey, C.G. & Bridgman, Leonard. Jane's All the World's Aircraft 1938. Sampson Low, Marston & company, ltd.. London. 1938

External links
Photo
Photo

1930s Belgian bomber aircraft
1930s Belgian military reconnaissance aircraft
Biplanes
Aircraft first flown in 1936
Twin piston-engined tractor aircraft